Events from the year 1163 in Ireland.

Incumbents
High King: Muirchertach Mac Lochlainn

Events
Christ Church Cathedral, Dublin was converted to a priory of the Regular Order of Arrosian Canons (Reformed Augustinian Rule) by the second Archbishop of Dublin, Laurence O'Toole.

References

 
1160s in Ireland
Ireland
Years of the 12th century in Ireland